The Miami-Dade Expressway Authority (MDX) is an independent agency created in December 1994 by the State of Florida and the Miami-Dade County Commission. Since 1997 MDX has operated and maintained five expressways formerly operated by the Florida Department of Transportation (FDOT):
 Gratigny Parkway (SR 924)
 Airport Expressway (SR 112)
 Dolphin Expressway (SR 836)
 Don Shula Expressway (SR 874)
 Snapper Creek Expressway (SR 878)

All five expressways are all electronic toll roads, requiring the use of SunPass or a "toll-by-plate" program and do not accept cash, and the free movement sections were removed. The Gratigny Parkway, Don Shula Expressway, and Snapper Creek Expressway became all electronic in 2010, while the Airport Expressway and Dolphin Expressway were converted 2014.

Completely funded by toll revenues, MDX has been aggressively upgrading and updating its roads over the past decade, including the ongoing Dolphin Expressway extension (the first phase was completed in 2007) and re-engineering of several interchanges of its two oldest expressways (the Airport and Dolphin). Long-term plans include the redesign and reconstruction of longtime bottlenecks in the Shula and Dolphin Expressways, most notably the often-backed-up Killian Parkway/SR 990 interchange near Miami Dade College-Kendall Campus and the heavily congested interchange with the Palmetto Expressway (SR 826) near the extreme southwestern end of Miami International Airport.

Markings 
All MDX highways use the shield-shaped signs reserved by FDOT for toll roads, with the MDX logo (see above) attached below the "shield". In addition, all MDX highways use a uniquely designed mileage marker. Instead of the green "MILE XX" markers commonly seen on interstate highways, the five MDX expressways use blue mileage markers featuring (from top to bottom, in white): a single letter indicating the direction of travel, the State Road designation of the highway (complete with outline of the State of Florida), and two numbers separated by a horizontal line ("2" on the top, "4" on the bottom of the line represents Mile Marker 2.4 from either the southern or western end of the expressway). These markers are placed on the edge of the shoulder every 0.2 miles along the expressway. The Gratigny Parkway has two of these (Mile Markers 5.0 and 5.2) on a surface street near Opa-locka on Northwest 119th Street just east of the end of its easternmost ramp).

Prior to the removal of free movement sections, on portions of a MDX route where no tolls are ahead, the TOLL in the green section of the TOLL shield was removed.

Airport Expressway

State Road 112, locally known as Airport Expressway is a 4-mile-long east–west expressway connecting Miami International Airport in Miami to I-95 and I-195, which ultimately connects to Miami Beach.

Dolphin Expressway

State Road 836, locally known as the Dolphin Expressway, is a 13.8-mile-long toll road currently extending from Southwest 137th Avenue in the west to I-95 in the east. The section of roadway east of I-95 is designated as I-395 or the MacArthur Causeway.

Don Shula Expressway

State Road 874, locally known as the Don Shula Expressway, is 7 miles long, connecting the Homestead Extension of Florida's Turnpike and Palmetto Expressway in central Miami-Dade County, Florida. As of July 17, 2010, the Don Shula Expressway no longer accepts cash.

Snapper Creek Expressway

State Road 878, locally known as the Snapper Creek Expressway, stretches for 3 miles between Don Shula Expressway (State Road 874) and U.S. Highway 1 (South Dixie Highway - SR 5). This provides access to Kendall and South Miami. Although constructed, improved and maintained through toll revenue, the Snapper Creek Expressway was untolled until July 17, 2010, when open road tolling (ORT) was initiated on the Expressway.

Gratigny Parkway

State Road 924, locally known as Gratigny Parkway, is a 5.2-mile-long limited access all-electronic toll road maintained by the Miami-Dade Expressway, running east to west. The Gratigny Parkway starts east of the Palmetto Expressway/I-75 interchange in Hialeah and ends at Northwest 32nd Avenue in North Miami. The section of roadway east of NW 32nd Avenue is a surface street (Northwest 119th Street) also known as Gratigny Road. Despite its relatively short length, SR 924 is a major east–west artery in northern Miami-Dade County, Florida.

See also
Transportation in Miami

References

External links
Miami-Dade Expressway Authority website
Information about the MDX's conversion to open road tolling

Transportation in Miami-Dade County, Florida
Toll road authorities of the United States
1994 establishments in Florida